The 1991 CONCACAF Champions' Cup was the 27th edition of the annual international club football competition held in the CONCACAF region (North America, Central America and the Caribbean), the CONCACAF Champions' Cup. It determined that year's club champion of association football in the CONCACAF region and was played from 7 April till 24 September 1991.

The teams were split in three zones (North, Central and Caribbean), each one qualifying the winner to the final tournament, where the winners of the Caribbean and Central zones played a semi-final to decide who was going to play against the Northern champion in the final. All the matches in the tournament were played under the home/away match system.

Mexican club Puebla beat Trinidarian Police 4–2 on aggregate. Therefore, Puebla won their first CONCACAF championship, which was also their first international title.

North American Zone

First round

Second round

Brooklyn Italians and Pembroke Hamilton Zebras withdrew.  Puebla and Universidad de Guadalajara automatically advanced to third round.

Third round

Puebla advances to the CONCACAF Final Series.

Central American Zone

First round

Second round

Alajuelense bye.

Third round

|}
Real C.D. España and Deportivo Saprissa advance to the fourth round.

Final

|}
Real C.D. España advances to the CONCACAF Final Series.

Caribbean Zone

First round

|}

Second round

|}

Third round

|}

Fourth round

|}

Final

|}

Semifinal 
September 8, 1991

Venue: Estadio Francisco MorazánCity: San Pedro Sula, Honduras

|}

September 15, 1991

Venue: Hasely Crawford StadiumCity: Port of Spain, Trinidad and Tobago

|}
 Puebla on bye, to the Final.
Police advance to the Final.

Final

First leg

Second leg 

|}
Puebla won 3–1 on points (4–2 on aggregate)

Champion

References

CONCACAF Champions' Cup
c
c